The 2013–14 Melbourne Renegades season is the third in the club's history. Coached by David Saker and captained by Aaron Finch, they competed in the BBL's 2013–14 season.

Summary
Despite maintaining the majority of their squad from the previous season, and also recruiting Australian test bowlers Peter Siddle and James Pattinson, the Renegades struggled in the 2013–14 Big Bash League season, only winning 3 games, and in the process finishing 6th and missing the finals.

Fixtures

Regular season

Ladder

Ladder progress

Squad information
The following is the Renegades men squad for the 2013–14 Big Bash League season.

Season statistics

Home attendance

References

External links
 Official website of the Melbourne Renegades
 Official website of the Big Bash League

Melbourne Renegades seasons